Springbank Football Club was a short-lived Scottish senior football team based in the town of Cumnock, Ayrshire. They were formed in 1892 and that year joined the South of Scotland Football League for its inaugural but ill-fated 1892–93 season. The club played their home games at New Station Park, Cumnock, but folded in 1894.

The town had previously been represented in the senior ranks by Cumnock Football Club. This club was formed in 1875 and entered the Scottish FA Cup on many occasions without distinction. Cumnock played in a maroon and white kit and also played their home games at New Station Park.

The town is now represented at junior level only by Cumnock Juniors who were formed in 1912.

References

Defunct football clubs in Scotland
Association football clubs established in 1882
Association football clubs disestablished in 1894
1892 establishments in Scotland
1894 disestablishments in Scotland
South of Scotland Football League teams